is a male Japanese racewalker. He competed in the 20 kilometres walk event at the 2015 World Championships in Athletics in Beijing, China. On December 13, 2015, he set the Asian record for the 10,000m race walk on a track.  In 2016, he was the #1 ranked walker in the world for 20 km.  As a result of his fast time in February, he was considered Japan's next great walking hope, replacing teammate world record holder Yusuke Suzuki.  He walked in the 2016 Olympics where he walked with the lead (chase) pack until almost 14 km when eventual winner Cai Zelin broke the race open.  Takahashi eventually finished 42nd.

See also
 Japan at the 2015 World Championships in Athletics

References

External links

Living people
1992 births
Place of birth missing (living people)
Japanese male racewalkers
Olympic male racewalkers
Olympic athletes of Japan
Athletes (track and field) at the 2016 Summer Olympics
Athletes (track and field) at the 2020 Summer Olympics
Asian Games competitors for Japan
Athletes (track and field) at the 2014 Asian Games
Athletes (track and field) at the 2018 Asian Games
World Athletics Championships athletes for Japan
Japan Championships in Athletics winners
20th-century Japanese people
21st-century Japanese people